Korea competed in the Summer Olympic Games in London, United Kingdom. It was the first time Korea competed as an independent country. The Korean Olympic Committee, established in 1946 and recognized in 1947, represented only South Korea although the division of Korea was not fully realized at the time of the 1948 Games.

Korea won two bronze medals, putting it at the 32nd rank of competing nations.

Medalists

Results and competitors by event

Athletics

Men
Track & road events

Field

Women

Field

Basketball

Group stage
Group B

 Korea 29-27 Belgium
 Philippines 35-33 Korea
 China 49-48 Korea
 Korea 120-20 Iraq
 Korea 28-21 Chile

Quarterfinals
 Mexico 43-32 Korea

Classification 7/8
 Czechoslovakia 39-38 Korea

Squad
An Byeong-Seok, Bang Won-Sun, Chang Ri-Jin, Jo Deuk-Jun, Gang Bong-Hyeon, Kim Jeong-Sin, Lee Jun-Yeong, Lee Sang-Hun, O Su-Cheol

Boxing

Cycling

Football

First round

Quarterfinal

Squad

Weightlifting

Wrestling
Men's Freestyle

References
Official Olympic Reports
International Olympic Committee results database

Korea, South
1948
Olympics